Lulami (also Loulami) was the capital of the Dendi of the Songhai Empire. It was established by Askia Nuh, son of Askia Dawud and it is from here the Songhai resistance against Morocco continued. In 1639 during the reign of Askia Ismail, the Moroccan Pasha Mesaoud sacked the town of Lulami. The location of this town is unknown but believed to be south of the town of Say in Niger.

References

History of Niger
Songhai Empire
French West Africa
Communities on the Niger River
Capitals of former nations